KDSK can refer to:

 KDSK (AM), a radio station at 1240 AM located in Albuquerque, New Mexico
 KDSK-FM, a radio station at 92.7 FM located in Grants, New Mexico